Silence (also Project Hard), is a  severely overhanging sport climbing route in the granite Hanshelleren Cave, in Flatanger, Norway. To complete the route, Ondra undertook specialist physical and mental training to overcome its severely overhanging terrain. As of March 2023, Silence remains unrepeated.

History
Ondra bolted the route in 2012–2013while he climbed   at Flatanger, the world's first 9b+but dropped the project for a period saying: "I could sort of imagine doing the individual moves, but I could see that linking the whole sequence, with its 8C boulder, all the way from the ground just looked way too ridiculous". After retrying it in 2015 and working through some of the technical challenges, Ondra began to commit more time to the project calling it "my lifetime goal", in a 2016 interview with Climbing. Ondra undertook specialist physical and mental training techniques for the route, including muscle work for the various critical kneebar rest positions, and route visualization for the sustained disorientation of the overhanging terrain. After 40 days of climbing spread over 7 visits from 2016 to 2017, Ondra free climbed the route on 3 September 2017.

On completion, Ondra said: "At the end of the route when I knew I did it, I had one of the strangest emotions ever", and "I clipped the anchor and I could not even scream. All I could do was just hang in the rope, feeling tears in my eyes. It was too much joy, relief, and excitement all mixed together". While the route was originally named Project Hard by Ondra, a few days after completion he renamed it Silence, stating that when climbing it he felt a sense of inner quiet, and that on completion he felt unable to scream in exhilaration, his trademark reaction on completing a climb.

Ondra described it as "much harder than anything else" he had previously done, and cautiously suggested the  rating, telling The Guardian, "Everyone knows what it means to run 100-meters in a world record time. Because grades in climbing are subjective, I am a fan of making big gaps between climbing grades. Knowing it was so much harder gives me the courage to say it is the world’s first at this level (9c)". In a 2020 interview, Ondra was asked if the route could actually be higher than 9c, he responded: "No, certainly not. 9c + or even 10a would have to be much, much more difficult if we don't want to inflate the difficulty scale in the future either. Each step on the difficulty scale really has to be a noticeable step in the actual difficulty of the route".

Ondra's first ascent of the route was documented in the 2018 film, Silence.

In April 2022, French climber Sébastien Bouin – a frequent climbing partner of Ondra – established the world's second-ever  route, which he called , in the La Ramirole cave, Verdon Gorge in France; it also remains unrepeated (2023).

Route

The first crux boulder problem was described by Ondra as the hardest  he had ever climbed consisting of 10 incredibly hard and very unusual moves, including single-finger locks, climbing upside down, and a variation of a figure four move, and finally ending with a poor kneebar rest where Ondra could hang upside-down for a minute to rest (having done specialist muscle training for this "bat-hang" rest). Ondra said the 8C boulder problem took the most time to solve. In a 2017 interview, Ondra added more color to the first  boulder crux stating: "The strangest moves are on the V15 crux 1, which is very physical, but the most precision-demanding climbing I have ever seen in my life. It is very hard to turn upside down, “stab” my left foot super high into the crack, doing it 100-percent precisely, [and] finish the sequence with this foot jam, doing the last move while doing the most extreme drop-knee I have ever done, which feels like it would tear my knee and back apart."

After the third boulder crux, a large jug leads to the anchor through a relatively easy  boulder consisting of five moves.

Ascents
Ondra remains the only person to have climbed Silence, and it awaits a repeat ascent.

In 2020, English crack climbing specialist Pete Whittaker tried some crack techniques at the  bouldering crux to see if a climber could avoid the intense pressure on the knee that Ondra's approach used (Whittaker did not attempt any other part of the route). While Ondra found his techniques to have merit, they would also have drawbacks (especially the type of climbing shoes needed), and that would not affect the grade of the route.

Italian climber Stefano Ghisolfi failed to complete the route during August/September 2022, but felt that it was probably at  difficulty; he plans to return in 2023.

Filmography
 Adam Ondra's first ascent:

Gallery

See also

History of rock climbing
List of first ascents (sport climbing)
La Dura Dura, second climb in the world with a potential grade of 
Jumbo Love, first climb in the world with a consensus grade of 
Realization/Biographie, first climb in the world with a consensus grade of 
Action Directe, first climb in the world with a consensus grade of 
 Hubble, first climb in the world with a consensus grade of

References

External links
Silence: The Story of Adam Ondra and the World's First 5.15d, Climbing (February 2018)

Climbing routes
2017 in sport climbing
Sport climbing